Vontae Ottis Davis (born May 27, 1988) is a former American football cornerback who played for the Miami Dolphins, Indianapolis Colts, and Buffalo Bills of the National Football League (NFL). He played college football at Illinois, and was drafted by the Dolphins in the first round of the 2009 NFL Draft. He made two Pro Bowls in his career. Davis retired from the NFL in the middle of the Bills' second game of the 2018 season, removing himself from the game at halftime.

Early years
Davis attended Dunbar High School in Washington, D.C., where he was a letterman in football and track. He played football as a cornerback and wide receiver. During his senior season, he recorded 38 tackles and eight interceptions and achieved many awards and honors including Washington Post first-team All-Metro, PrepStar All-American, DCIAA West first-team All-Conference, and D.C. Gatorade Player of the Year.

In track & field, Davis was one of the district's top sprinters. As a senior in 2006, he recorded personal-best times of 10.97 seconds in the 100-meter dash and 22.78 seconds in the 200-meter dash at the DCIAA East/West Championships, placing first in both events. He also recorded a 4.40-second 40-yard dash and a 33-inch vertical jump.

Considered a three-star recruit by Rivals.com, Davis was ranked as the No. 33 cornerback prospect in the nation.

College career
Davis chose Illinois over Maryland, Michigan State, and Virginia. Davis had a great freshman season for the Fighting Illini recording 30 tackles and intercepting one pass. He was named to the Freshman All-America first teams by The Sporting News, Scout.com, and Rivals.com and was also the Fighting Illini's Rookie of the Year. In 2007, he started all 12 games he played recording 56 tackles, including 13 in the Rose Bowl against USC, and was tied for third in the Big Ten with four interceptions. After his junior season, he declared that he would forgo his senior season and become eligible for the 2009 NFL Draft.

College statistics

Professional career
Davis attended the NFL Scouting Combine in Indianapolis, Indiana and completed all of the combine and positional drills. On March 18, 2009, Davis attended Illinois' pro day and opted to perform the majority of combine drills. He posted better times in the 40-yard dash (4.40s), 20-yard dash (2.52s), and 10-yard dash (1.48s) while also adding height to his vertical jump (37.5"). At the conclusion of the pre-draft process, Davis was projected to be first or second round selection by NFL draft experts and scouts. He was ranked the third best cornerback prospect in the draft by DraftScout.com.

Miami Dolphins
The Miami Dolphins selected Davis in the first round (25th overall) of the 2009 NFL Draft. Davis was the second cornerback drafted behind Ohio State's Malcolm Jenkins and was the first of two cornerbacks the Dolphins selected in the first two rounds, along with Utah's Sean Smith who they drafted in the second round (61st overall).

2009
On July 31, 2009, the Miami Dolphins signed Davis to a five-year, $10.25 million contract that includes $7.43 million guaranteed and a signing bonus of $500,000.

Throughout training camp, Davis competed for a job as a starting cornerback against Eric Green and Sean Smith. Head coach Tony Sparano named Davis the fourth cornerback on the Dolphins' depth chart to begin the regular season, behind Will Allen, Sean Smith, and Nathan Jones.

He made his professional regular season debut in the Miami Dolphins' season-opener at the Atlanta Falcons and made a solo tackle during their 10–7 loss. Davis recorded his first career regular season tackle on wide receiver Michael Jenkins for a three-yard loss in the fourth quarter. Davis surpassed Nathan Jones on the depth chart after the Miami Dolphins' Week 3 loss at the San Diego Chargers. On October 4, 2009, Davis recorded three solo tackles, a pass deflection, and returned his first career interception for a touchdown during a 38–10 victory against the Buffalo Bills in Week 4. He intercepted a pass attempt by quarterback Trent Edwards that was originally intended for Josh Reed and returned it for a 23-yard touchdown at the end of the second quarter. On November 1, 2009, Davis earned his first career start in place of Will Allen who was placed on injured reserve after tearing his ACL the previous week. He recorded a season-high seven combined tackles and two pass deflections during their 39–25 victory at the New York Jets in Week 8. The following week, he collected a season-high six solo tackles, broke up two passes, and intercepted a pass by Tom Brady during a 27–17 loss at the New England Patriots in Week 9. Davis led the team in interceptions as a rookie and led all defensive backs on the team in tackles. Pro Football Weekly selected Davis on its annual All-Rookie team.

2010
Davis entered training camp slated as the No.1 starting cornerback on the depth chart. Head coach Tony Sparano officially named Davis the starting cornerback to start the regular season, alongside Jason Allen and nickelback Nolan Carroll.

He started in the Miami Dolphins' season-opener at the Buffalo Bills and made two solo tackles and deflected a pass in their 15–10 victory. In Week 2, Davis collected six solo tackles, two pass deflections, and intercepted a pass by Brett Favre during a 14–10 victory at the Minnesota Vikings. After the game, Vikings' quarterback Brett Favre stated, "Number 21, I felt like, was one of the best corners in this league, especially that no one knows about." On November 7, 2010, Davis collected a season-high seven combined tackles and a pass deflection in the Dolphins' 27–10 loss at the Baltimore Ravens in Week 9. Davis completed the  season with 54 combined tackles (46 solo), 12 pass deflections, and an interception in 16 games and 15 starts.

2011
Defensive coordinator Mike Nolan retained Davis as a starting cornerback, along with Sean Smith, to start the season. Davis started in the Miami Dolphins' season-opener against the New England Patriots and recorded four combined tackles before exiting the 38–24 loss due to cramps. The following week, he collected six solo tackles in the Dolphins' 23–13 loss to the Houston Texans in Week 2. He exited in the third quarter due to a hamstring injury and was inactive for the next two games (Weeks 3–4) In Week 14, he made four solo tackles, broke up a pass, and made his first career sack on quarterback Carson Palmer as the Dolphins defeated Oakland 34–14. On December 13, 2011, the Miami Dolphins fired head coach Tony Sparano after falling to a 4–9 record. Defensive backs coach Todd Bowles was named the interim head coach for the last three games. On December 18, 2011, Davis recorded five combined tackles, two pass deflections, and intercepted two passes by Ryan Fitzpatrick in the Dolphins' 30–23 win at the Buffalo Bills in Week 15. The interceptions marked his first career multi-interception game. He finished the  season with 43 combined tackles (39 solo), nine pass deflections, four interceptions, and a sack in 12 games and 12 starts.

2012
Davis entered training camp slated as a starting cornerback, along with Sean Smith, but saw competition from Richard Marshall and Nolan Carroll. During camp, he was surpassed on the depth chart by Marshall and was demoted to being the third cornerback on the depth chart. Following his demotion, he competed to be the first-team nickelback against Nolan Carroll.

Indianapolis Colts
On August 26, 2012, the Miami Dolphins traded Davis to the Indianapolis Colts in exchange for their second round pick (54th overall) and a conditional sixth round pick in the 2013 NFL Draft. The Miami Dolphins used the second round pick they received in the trade to draft cornerback Jamar Taylor, but did not receive a conditional sixth round pick after Davis did not exceed more than 65% of the Colts' defensive snaps in 2012.

Head coach Chuck Pagano named Davis a starting cornerback to begin the regular season, along with Jerraud Powers. He made his Indianapolis Colts regular season debut in their season-opener at the Chicago Bears and recorded five solo tackles in their 41–22 loss. Davis was inactive for two games (Weeks 5–6) due to an ankle injury he sustained in Week 3. On October 28, 2012, Davis made one tackle before exiting the Colts' 19–13 victory at the Tennessee Titans in the first quarter after injuring his knee. His injury sidelined him for the next four games (Weeks 9–12). In Week 14, he collected eight combined tackles, broke up a pass, and sacked quarterback Jake Locker during a 27–23 win at the Tennessee Titans. The following week, Davis collected a season-high nine solo tackles during a 29–17 loss at the Houston Texans in Week 15. On December 30, 2012, Davis recorded five solo tackles, three pass deflections, and intercepted two passes by Matt Schaub during a 28–16 win in Week 17. He finished the season with 51 combined tackles (46 solo), seven passes defensed, three interceptions, and a sack in ten games and ten starts.

The Indianapolis Colts finished second in the AFC South with an 11–5 record and clinched a wildcard berth. On January 6, 2013, Davis started his first career playoff game as the Colts lost 24–9 to the eventual Super Bowl champions, Baltimore Ravens, in the AFC Wildcard Game.

2013
Defensive coordinator Greg Manusky retained Davis as the No. 1 starting cornerback to begin the season, along with Greg Toler and nickelback Darius Butler. In Week 4, Davis had a season-high two pass deflections, three solo tackles, and made an interception during their 37–3 victory at the Jacksonville Jaguars. On October 14, 2013, he collected a season-high seven combined tackles in the Colts' 19–9 loss at the San Diego Chargers in Week 6. He finished the  season with 46 combined tackles (41 solo), 12 pass deflections, and an interception in 16 games and 16 starts.

The Indianapolis Colts finished atop their division with an 11–5 record. On January 4, 2014, Davis started in the AFC Wildcard Game and recorded three combined tackles during a 45–44 victory against the Kansas City Chiefs. The following week, he made one tackle in the Colts' 43–22 loss at the New England Patriots in the AFC Divisional Round. Davis earned an overall grade of 86.0 from Pro Football Focus, which was the sixth highest grade among all qualifying cornerbacks in 2013.

2014
On March 11, 2014, the Indianapolis Colts signed Davis to a four-year, $39 million contract with $20 million guaranteed.

Davis and Greg Toler returned as the Colts' starting cornerback duo to begin the 2014 regular season. On October 9, 2014, Davis collected a season-high five combined tackles and a pass deflection during a 33–28 victory at the Houston Texans in Week 6. In Week 12, he made two solo tackles, two pass deflections, and returned an interception for 42-yards in the Colts' 23–3 win against the Jacksonville Jaguars. The following week, Davis recorded two combined tackles and two pass deflections before leaving the Colts' 49–27 victory against the Washington Redskins in the second quarter after sustaining a concussion. He received the concussion while attempting to tackle running back Roy Helu and remained on the ground for several minutes before walking off the field on his own will. He remained in the Colts' concussion protocol and was inactive for their Week 14 victory at the Cleveland Browns. On December 23, 2014, it was announced that Davis was selected to the 2015 Pro Bowl. Davis completed the  season with 42 combined tackles (35 solo), a career-high 18 pass deflections, and four interceptions in 15 games and 15 starts. He also led the NFL in lowest opposing passer rating (38.8) and earned an overall grade of 95.1, which was the second highest overall grade among all qualifying cornerbacks in 2014.

The Indianapolis Colts finished first in the AFC South with an 11–5 record and reached the AFC Championship before being defeated 45–7 by the New England Patriots who eventually won Super Bowl XLIX. During the AFC Divisional Round, Davis recorded eight combined tackles and a career-high five pass deflections in the Colts' 24–13 victory at the Denver Broncos.

2015
On October 25, 2015, Davis collected a season-high six combined tackles, two pass deflections, and an interception during a 27–21 loss to the New Orleans Saints in Week 7. The following week, Davis collected two solo tackles, two pass deflections, and 
intercepted a pass by Cam Newton in the Colts' 29–26 loss at the Carolina Panthers in Week 8. He finished the season with 48 combined tackles (38 solo), 16 pass deflections, and four interceptions in 16 games and 16 starts. On January 25, 2016, Davis was selected to the 2016 Pro Bowl as a replacement for Chris Harris Jr. who was playing in Super Bowl 50 as a member of the Denver Broncos. He received an overall grade of 86.9 from Pro Football Focus and ranked third among all qualifying cornerbacks in 2015.

2016
Defensive coordinator Ted Monachino retained Davis as the No. 1 starting cornerback to start the season, along with Patrick Robinson. Davis was sidelined for the first two games of the regular season after spraining his ankle in the Colts' first preseason game. On October 16, 2016, Davis recorded a season-high five combined tackles, two pass deflections, and an interception during a 26–23 loss at the Houston Texans in Week 6. In Week 16, he made a season-high five solo tackles and broke up a pass in the Colts' 33–25 loss at the Oakland Raiders. He finished the  season with 37 combined tackles (34 solo), ten pass deflections, and an interception in 14 games and 14 starts. Pro Football Focus gave Davis an overall grade of 47.3 in 2016.

2017
Davis entered training camp slated as a starting cornerback along with Rashaan Melvin. He sustained a groin injury during the preseason and was sidelined for the first three games of the regular season (Weeks 1–3). On October 1, 2017, he started in his first game of the season and collected a season-high six solo tackles in the Colts' 46–18 loss at the Seattle Seahawks in Week 4.

On October 29, 2017, Davis collected four combined tackles and a pass deflection during a 24–23 loss at the Cincinnati Bengals in Week 8. Prior to the game, it was reported that the Indianapolis Colts received inquiries from two teams about possibly trading for Davis. Head coach Chuck Pagano benched Davis in favor of rookie Quincy Wilson during the Colts' Week 9 victory against the Houston Texans in what he called a non-injury related coaching decision. Davis voiced his displeasure and stated he felt disrespected after the Colts did not allow him to travel with the team to Houston. On November 8, 2017, it was reported that Davis decided to have surgery to repair a lingering groin injury he sustained during the preseason, which would take him out of play for the remainder of the season On November 9, 2017, the Indianapolis Colts released Davis, ending a six-year tenure with the team. Davis finished his truncated  season with 21 combined tackles (16 solo) and two pass deflections in five games and five starts. Pro Football Focus gave Davis an overall grade of 45.2, which ranked 103rd among all qualifying cornerbacks in 2017.

Buffalo Bills
On February 26, 2018, Davis signed a one-year deal with the Buffalo Bills worth up to $5 million, with $3.5 million guaranteed.

During the September 16, 2018, game against the Los Angeles Chargers, Davis removed himself from play during the first half, stating he was "done." According to a statement made by head coach Sean McDermott, it was not immediately clear whether he meant to retire or simply leave that particular game. Following the game, Davis released a statement confirming his retirement. Davis' decision was initially not taken well by his teammates and later lampooned in the media.

Davis later commented that his abrupt retirement was due to an abrupt realization that football was no longer what he was meant to be doing, and that "leaving was therapeutic".

NFL career statistics

Regular season

Personal life

Vontae is the younger brother of former San Francisco 49ers, Denver Broncos, and Washington Redskins' tight end Vernon Davis. In June 2009, several media outlets incorrectly reported that Davis was stopped and arrested for traffic infractions in Champaign, Illinois. The incident turned out to be the result of identity theft after Davis's wallet was stolen. In June 2015, Davis married his girlfriend Megan Harpe. , Davis is CEO of a holistic wellness spa that opened in October 2019 in Fort Lauderdale, Florida.

References

External links

  Sports Reference (college)
 
 
 

1988 births
Living people
American football cornerbacks
Buffalo Bills players
Illinois Fighting Illini football players
Indianapolis Colts players
Miami Dolphins players
Unconferenced Pro Bowl players
Players of American football from Washington, D.C.
Dunbar High School (Washington, D.C.) alumni
American chief executives